Indocephalites is a true ammonite (order Ammonitida) and a possible subgenus of Macrocephalites, belonging to the stephanoceratacean family, Macrocephalitidae. Inner whorls form a cadicone (a barrel shape), outer become more compressed and smoother. Ribs are simple, crossing the venter straight and uninterrupted. Pleurocephalites, another possible subgenus of Macrocephalites, is quite similar.

Distribution 
Jurassic deposits of China, France, India and Madagascar

References

 Treatise in Invertebrate Paleontology, Part L (1957), Mesozoic Ammonoidea. p.K294

Jurassic ammonites
Ammonitida
Fossils of India